Güme  is a village in Mut district of Mersin Province, Turkey. It is a high village which is also a yayla (resort) for Mut citizens during the summer . The population of the village is 266  as of 2012. The village  is an old village and it was founded during the Karamanoğlu beylik era. The main economic activity of the village is animal breeding. Agriculture and beehiving are other activities. Apple is the main agricultural crop.

References

Villages in Mut District